STANAG 4427 on Configuration Management in System Life Cycle Management is the Standardization Agreement (STANAG) of NATO nations on how to do configuration management (CM) on defense systems. The STANAG, and its supporting NATO publications, provides guidance on managing the configuration of products and services. It is unique in its full life cycle perspective, requiring a Life Cycle CM Plan, and in its approach to contracting for CM, using an ISO standard as the base, and building-up additional requirements (as opposed to the classical tailoring-down).

History
STANAG 4427 is NATO’s agreement on how to do configuration management on defense systems. Edition 1 was originally promulgated in 1997 and updated with Edition 2 in 2007. The first iteration of the Standardization Agreement was entitled Introduction of Allied Configuration Management Publications (ACMPs), and it called on ratifying nations to use seven NATO publications (ACMP 1-7) as the agreed upon contractual clauses for configuration management. 

In 2010, NATO undertook to review and revise the STANAGs and ACMPs with two major assignments: make the NATO guidance useful and extend the guidance through the full project life cycle. This work resulted in the promulgation of STANAG 4427 Edition 3, Configuration Management in System Life Cycle Management, in 2014. As of 2017, it has been ratified by 19 nations.

Overview
With Edition 3, NATO published three new ACMPs: ACMP-2000, Policy on Configuration Management; ACMP-2009, Guidance on Configuration Management; and ACMP-2100, Configuration Management Contractual Requirements. This trio of publications uses a civil standard as the platform (ISO 10007), requires the acquirer to prepare and maintain a Life Cycle CM Plan for the system, to use a combination of governance and insight that is required to achieve the specific system objectives, and to build-up contractual requirements based on defined needs, rather than boilerplates.

NATO publications covered by STANAG 4427 Edition 3
 ACMP-2000 Ed. A Ver. 2 – Policy on Configuration Management Promulgated
 ACMP-2009 Ed. A Ver. 2 – Guidance on Configuration Management Promulgated
 ACMP-2100 Ed. A Ver. 2 – Configuration Management Contractual Requirements
 ACMP-2009-SRD-10 Ed. A Ver. 1 – Nato CM Training Package Promulgated
 ACMP-2009-SRD-40 Ed. A Ver. 1 – Predefined Levels of CM Requirement Build-Up
 ACMP-2009-SRD-41 Ed. A Ver. 2 – Examples of CM Plan Requirements
 ACMP-2009-SRD-51 Ed. A Ver. 1 – Nci Agency CM Tools Promulgated 
 SRD-2009-49 Ed. A Ver. 1 – NATO-UU Configuration Management Contract Scoping Tool

References

Copies of NATO Configuration Management publications are available, for free, at the NATO Standardization Office web sites below,  or at this site:
 NATO STANDARDIZATION OFFICE
 http://nso.nato.int/nso/nsdd/stanagdetails.html?idCover=8517&LA=EN 
 Configuration management
 Defense Standardization Program Journal, October/December 2011, NATO Revises Configuration Management Guidelines
 http://www.dsp.dla.mil/Portals/26/Documents/Publications/Journal/111001-DSPJ.pdf

NATO_STANAG_4427_on_CM 
STANAG_4427_on_Configuration_Management 
4427_on_CM
NATO_STANAG_4427_on_CM
Military standardization